Khirbat al-Shuna or Khirbat ash Shuna was a Palestinian Arab village in the Haifa Subdistrict. It was depopulated during the 1947–1948 Civil War in Mandatory Palestine on March 15, 1948. It was located 32.5 km south of Haifa. Khirbat al-Shuna contained  a small archaeological site, Khirbat Tell Mubarak. The area is now part of a JNF park, immediately north of Binyamina-Giv'at Ada.

References

External links
Welcome To al-Shuna, Khirbat at palestineremembered.com
Khirbat al-Shuna (Haifa), Zochrot
Survey of Western Palestine, Map 8:  IAA, Wikimedia commons

Arab villages depopulated during the 1948 Arab–Israeli War
District of Haifa